Ömer Döngeloğlu (1968 – 3 May 2020) was a Turkish theologian, writer, producer and television presenter. He was known for the religious programs he hosted on Kanal 7. He died from COVID-19 in Istanbul on 3 May 2020.

Life 
He completed his primary education in Zile Altunyurt Primary School and his secondary education in Zile İmam Hatip High School. Later he graduated from Sakarya University School of Theology. He was fluent in Arabic and English.

Döngeloğlu worked as a preacher in his hometown in Tokat between 1986 and 1996. He worked in various administrative positions in the public sector for many years. He spent years researching, studying and reading Islamic history and Siyer-i Nebi.

Death 
He died on 3 May 2020, in Başakşehir State Hospital at age 51, where he was being treated for COVID-19 during the COVID-19 pandemic in Turkey, and was buried in Edirnekapı Martyr's Cemetery.

Works 
 Peygamberin İzinde
 Allah'a Adanmış Hayatlar
 Yeryüzünün Yıldızları
 Sözün Miracı; DUA
 Allah Resulünü Görenler
 Peygamberimizin Dostları
 Mus'ab bin Umeyr

References

External links 
 
 
 

1968 births
2020 deaths
Islamic television preachers
Turkish theologians
Turkish Sunni Muslims
Turkish writers
Turkish television presenters
Deaths from the COVID-19 pandemic in Turkey
Burials at Edirnekapı Martyr's Cemetery